Leon Guerts is a former Dutch politician who was a member of the Dutch Member of the House of Representatives for the Pim Fortuyn List. Geurts was said to be active in the VVD party before joining the LPF. He was initially 27th on the LPF party list, but rose one place due to the death of Fortuyn. As a result, he entered the Lower House during the 2002 Dutch general election when the LPF won 26 seats. However, two days after the election he was rejected from the LPF's parliamentary caucus after it was found he had falsified parts of his CV, including making an unverified claim that he had a PhD in economics from Erasmus University Rotterdam. He subsequently stepped down from the House and retired from politics citing media pressure and threats made to his LPF colleagues.

References 

Dutch politicians
Political controversies in the Netherlands
21st-century Dutch politicians
Members of the House of Representatives (Netherlands)
Pim Fortuyn List politicians

Year of birth missing (living people)
Living people